Gian Marco Centinaio (born 31 October 1971) is an Italian politician for the Lega Nord. He served as Minister of Agriculture and Tourism in the Conte Cabinet from 1 June 2018 to September 2019.

Biography 
Centinaio was born in Pavia on October 31, 1971. Centinaio received a Political Science degree from the University of Pavia in 1999.

Political career 
In 2005 he was elected Municipal Councilor in his hometown, then, from 2009 to 2013, he was Deputy Mayor and Councillor for Tourism and Culture of the Municipality of Pavia.

Italian Senate 
A candidate in Lombardy with Lega Nord, he was elected to the Senate of Italy in February 2013 for the Legislature XVII of Italy. In July 2014 Centinaio was elected the floor leader of his party, replacing Massimo Bitonci. On September 27, 2017, Centinaio would become embroiled in a fake news dispute, sharing on his Facebook accusations that Laura Boldrini, then President of the Chamber, was involved in a nepotistic scandal.

Centinaio was reelected to the Senate as part of the Legislature XVIII of Italy in March 2018, retaining his position as floor leader. During this period Centinaio would oppose the ratification of the Comprehensive Economic and Trade Agreement (CETA) between the EU and Canada.

Minister of Agriculture 
Centinaio was appointed as Minister of Agriculture in June 2018 as part of the Conte I Cabinet. He left this office with the introduction of the Conte II Cabinet in 2019.

Personal life 
Centinaio is married and has a son. He is a fan of Parma Calcio 1913 and enjoys motorcycling.

References

External links 

Senate bio of Centinaio

1971 births
Living people
Members of the Senate of the Republic (Italy)
Politicians from Pavia
University of Pavia alumni
Lega Nord politicians
Members of the Italian Senate from Lombardy
Agriculture ministers of Italy
Conte I Cabinet
Senators of Legislature XVII of Italy
Senators of Legislature XVIII of Italy